Thigmomorphogenesis (from Ancient Greek θιγγάνω (thingánō) to touch, μορφή (morphê) shape, and γένεσις (génesis) creation) is the response by plants to mechanical sensation (touch) by altering their  growth patterns.  In the wild, these patterns can be evinced by wind, raindrops, and rubbing by passing animals.

Botanists have long known that plants grown in a greenhouse tend to be taller and more spindly than plants grown outside.  M.J. Jaffe discovered in the 1970s that regular rubbing or bending of stems inhibits their elongation and stimulates their radial expansion, resulting in shorter, stockier plants.

Growth responses are caused by  changes in gene expression. This is likely related to the calcium-binding protein calmodulin, suggesting Ca2+ involvement in mediating growth responses.

Thigmomorphogenesis has also been determined to be a form of phenotypic plasticity in plants, potentially inducing different adaptive and stress responses in a variety of species.

References

External links
Video footage of some examples of thigmomorphogenesis

Plant physiology